Finite is the opposite of infinite. It may refer to:
 Finite number (disambiguation)
 Finite set, a set whose cardinality (number of elements) is some natural number
 Finite verb, a verb form that has a subject, usually being inflected or marked for person and/or tense or aspect
 "Finite", a song by Sara Groves from the album Invisible Empires

See also
 
 Nonfinite (disambiguation)

fr:Fini
it:Finito